Jānis Jansons (born 28 December 1982, in Talsi) is a Latvian floorball player who is currently playing for Pixbo Wallenstam IBK in the SSL.

National team
Jansons has played 21 games for the Latvian national team and collected 17 points. He has participated in six world floorball championships; 2000, 2002, 2004, 2006, 2008 and 2010.

"Reactive Jānis Jansons' - Jānis Jansons is the only Latvian player who played floorball in Mecca - Swedish super league. One of the most prominent Latvian national team player.

The first offer to play the Swedish elite league Jansons received in 2004. "Then we went to the Champions Cup tournament with Rubene team which was reinforced with another club's best player, and played with Pixbo 6:7!
Pixbo head coach Jan Inge Forsberg came to me and offered to play with them. "Then Jansons was only 22 years old, and he decided to pursue studies. Followed by an offer from another Swedish giant - AIC, but the last moment all dispersed."

Now Jānis Jansons is back after 2 seasons in Latvian Lielvārde floorball club and now he is a playing coach, but the situation for a player playing in Sweden he explains as follows:

"When I returned to play in Latvia, I was upset that I am not as good as I thought at the beginning. However, looking at how Sweden fared Zhelezniye Czech superstar, the world's best goalkeeper Toivoniemi bags, and other samplings leaders who are unable to settle in this league, you realize that it's not that simple", a Swedish professional visitors nationalism is difficult to live with.

Jānis Jansons became the 2011/2012 season Latvia champion, with floorbal club Lielvārde.

Career statistics

Note: GP = Games played; G = Goals; A = Assists; Pts = Points; PIM = Penalties in Minutes
Note: Full statistics are unavailable

References

External links
Janis Jansons profile at floorball.lv
Janis Jansons profile at innebandy.se
 Janis Jansons profile at IFF/floorball.org

1982 births
Living people
Latvian floorball players
People from Talsi